Bek or BEK may refer to:

People
 Khagan Bek, the title of the king of the Khazars
 Beck (Bek David Campbell; born 1970), Beck Hansen, American singer, songwriter, and musician
 Bek (sculptor) or Bak, an ancient Egyptian sculptor
 Bruce Eric Kaplan (born 1964), The New Yorker cartoonist known as BEK

Others
 Bek (family)
 Bek (crater), on Mercury
 Bek Air, airline in Kazakhstan
 Bek, an alternative spelling of Bey, a title of Turko-Mongol origin meaning chief or commander
 BEK, one of the identifying symbols for Fibroblast growth factor receptor 2

See also 
 Bec (disambiguation)
 Beck (disambiguation)